The  also called  were a pair of escort ships reconstructed from former Republic of China Navy Ning Hai class cruisers that were sunk during earlier battles-  from Ning Hai and  from Ping Hai - these ships were salvageable as river water doesn't corrode sunken hulls as badly as sea water would.  Originally they were to be transferred to the puppet government of Wang Jing-Wei, but instead of honoring the agreement, the Japanese seized and outfitted them first as barracks hulks and ultimately to their final form in 1944.

Since they were built on the same design from the start (just by two different builders), the reconstruction brought them to a more-or-less common standard: old armaments and fire control platforms were removed; aft superstructures (including the seaplane facility aboard the former Ning Hai) were replaced with bigger ones mounting boat handling cranes and a raised main gun position, and search radar sets were installed.  Their new armaments (secondary rifles passed from modernised cruisers and 25mm machine cannons), while seemingly lighter, were dual-purpose weapons more-suitable against contemporary aircraft.

Both Isoshima and Yasoshima were sunk by late 1944.

Ships

Bibliography 

Cruiser classes